Jitendra Jatashankar Rawal (born 30 March 1943) is an Indian astrophysicist and scientific educator, recognized for his work in the popularisation of science.

Rawal has served as Director of the Nehru Planetarium Mumbai.  He has published about 25 research papers in national and international scientific journals, and is the president of The Indian Planetary Society.

Rawal was born in a Gujarati family, in Halvad village at Morbi district, of Gujarat. He received an M.Phil degree in Physical Sciences, from Calcutta University, in 1975, and a PhD degree in astrophysics, from the University of Mumbai, 1992 (Thesis: Some Problems in the Solar System & in the Local Group of Galaxies).
He was also associated with Children Science Congress activities  popularizing scientific interest among school children in many Indian States.

Works 

Rawal is the author of many scientific and popular science works in the field of astronomy and related subjects, as follows:
 Solar System Parts I - IV  (all in Gujarati)
 Total Solar Eclipse (English & Gujarati)
 Science in India after Independence (Gujarati).
 The Story of Birth of the Planetarium (Gujarati).
 The Wonderful Sky (Gujarati).
 Scientist of the millennium (English / Hindi)

He has written eight science fiction stories in Gujarati and Hindi, which appeared originally in Janmbhoomi-Pravasi, New Surat Times, Sambhav, Mumbai Samachar and Nav Bharat Times. They have been translated into English and Marathi, as well.

He also wrote the scripts of the following planetarium shows, shown at the Nehru Planetarium:

 Journey to the Red Planet
 Astronomy of the Millennium
 Einstein and the Universe
 Collision in Space
Dr. J.J. Rawal of the Nehru Planetarium, Bombay, recorded the distance of four satellites, each 35520 km, 57710 km, 96130 km and 71300 km, away from the centre of Neptune.
 Our place in the universe (for the Indian Planetary Society only)

Awards 

Rawal has received many prestigious awards, including:

 Science Journalist Late. Shri Manubhai Mehta Award for Popularization of Science.
 Yogiji Maharaj Centenary Celebration Award for contribution to Science.
 Felicitated by Mayor of Mumbai.
 Marathi Vigyan Parishad's Smt. Manoramabai Apte Award for Popularization of Science in India.
 Felicitated by Marathi Vigyan Parishad and Marathi Vigyan Mahasangh for Scientific discoveries about rings around Planets.
 Received Award of National Council for Science and Technology Communication, Department of Science and Technology, Government of India for popularization of Science in the year 1994.
 Felicitated by Municipal Corporation of Rajkot and Saurashtra Education Foundation for Scientific activities in the Country.
 Felicitated by Amreli City towards contribution to Scientific activities.
 Received Best Science Column Writer award for the year 1998–99. Department of Information, Government of Gujarat
 Felicitated by University of Gowahati, Aassam for Scientific activities.
 Felicitated by Halvad City towards contribution to Scientific research.
 Received Award of Rotary Club of Bombay South, Rotary Club of Juhu. JC's in the field of Science.
 Felicitated by various organization for Scientific discoveries around the Planets and popularization of Science in the Country.
 Received Award from Amrita for Scientific discoveries. Amrita is a Cultural Organization which felicitates Scientists and artists of the Country.
 Awarded by Sardar Patel Jagruti Mandal in the field of Science in the Country.
 Received Award from Brihan Mumbai Gujarati Samaj in the field of Science.
 Felicitated by Panchwati education Society, Nasik.
 Received Award from Lion's Club in the field of Science.
 Felicitated by Government of Himachal Pradesh for Scientific activities in the Country.
 Felicitated by Zalawad Social Group towards in the field of Science.
 Felicitated by Jain Social Group towards contribution to Scientific research.
 Felicitated by Brahman Social Group for the Scientific discoveries.
 Felicitated by Halvad Yuvak Mandal and Zalawad Sattar Taluka Mandal for the Scientific discoveries.
 Felicitated by various Scientific and Cultural Organizations for the Scientific discoveries and popularization of Science in the Country.
 acknowledge as Resource Person to the pioneer Program IISSSA -India International Sarabhai Student Scientist Award patented and designed program by DASA India National - Science organization VO operated national and international level from its HO at AGARTALA TRIPURA under the National Chairmanship of Anjan Banik - reputed awarded science activist and Science communicator science educator.

References

Research papers
The following theoretical predictions of Dr. J.J. Rawal have come true through observations by NASA's space probes Pioneer 11, Voyager 2, Hubble Space Telescope, Parker Soar Space probe and Earth-based observations by telescopes

[1] 
Outermost ring of Saturn and its new Satellites 
Observation by Pioneer spacecraft send by NASA when it flew past Saturn in September, 1976 
Published paper: 
i.	Modified Titius –Bode Empirical Relation, 
Bulletin of Astronomical Society of India, Vol. 6, pg.92-95, 1978 
ii.	Resonant Structures in the Solar System 
The Moon and the Planets 24, 407–414, 1989 
iii.	Contraction of Sub-Solar Nebula 
Earth, Moon and Planets 49, 265–274, 1989 
iv.	Sky & Telescope, December 1981p. 541 
v.	Planetary Distance Law and Resonance, J. Astrophys. Astr. 10, 257-259 (1989) 
vi.	Further consideration of Contraction of Solar Nebula, Earth Moon and Planets, 34, 93–100, 1988

[2] 
Discovery of 20 more Satellites of Saturn 
Observation by Astronomers of Carneg Institute of Science in October, 2019 
Published Papers: 
i.	Modified Titius –Bode Empirical Relation, 
Bulletin of Astronomical Society of India, Vol. 6, pg.92-95, 1978 
ii.	Resonant Structures in the Solar System 
The Moon and the Planets 24, 407–414, 1989 
iii.	Contraction of Sub-Solar Nebula 
Earth, Moon and Planets 49, 265–274, 1989 
iv.	Sky & Telescope, December 1981p. 541 
v.	Planetary Distance Law and Resonance, J. Astrophys. Astr. 10, 257-259 (1989) 
vi.	Further consideration of Contraction of Solar Nebula, Earth Moon and Planets, 34, 93–100, 1988

[3] 
Rings Around Galaxies 
Observation: 
New Surveys have unveiled a thick ring of hundreds of millions of stars around the outskirts of our Milky Way Report of Robert Irion Jan 6, 2003; Science, 3, January, p 62 
Astronomers at the Sloan Digital Sky survey (SDSS) Apache Point Observatory in Sunspot, New Mexico 
Independently, European and Australian astronomers at the Roque de Los Muchqchas Observatory in La Palma, Canari Islands, spotted the Taurus in two other directions, strengthening the suspicion that it girdles the galaxy, 
Published papers: 
i.	Is There a Ring Around Milky Way? 
Indian Journal of Radio & Space Physics, Vol.11, pp. 100–101, June 1982

[4] 
Are There Rings Around the Sun? 
Observations: 
Parker Solar Probe NASA's Solar Probe found Tantalizing Evidence of Rings Around the Sun by Becky Ferreira 
5 December 2019 
The parker Solar Probe captured evidence of a passible dust-free zone, hinting at rings, along with insights into “magnetic islands” and plasma “blobs” 
These weird solar features are described in one of four new papers published in Nature on Wednesday, based on dispatches from a record- breaking NASA space craft called the Parker Solar Probe. 
Published Papers: 
i.	Resonant Structures in the Solar System 
The Moon and the Planets, 24, (1981), 407-414 
ii.	Contraction of the Solar Nebula 
Earth, Moon and Planets 31 (1984), 175-182 
iii.	Are There Rings Around
Earth, Moon and Planets (2012) 108, 95-99 
iv.	Planetary Distance Law and Resonance 
J. Astrophys Astr. 10, 257-259(1989) 
v.	Modified Titius –Bode Empirical Relation 
Bulletin Astronomical Society of India 6, 92–95, 1978 
vi.	Further considerations of Contraction of Solar Nebula 
Earth, Moon and Planets 34, 93–100, 1986 
vii.	News Notes Sky & Telescope December 1981 p. 541 
viii.	Formation of the Solar System 
Astrophysics and Space Science 119, 159, 166 (1986)

[5] 
Outermost Ring Around Uranus and its new Satellites 
Observations: 
Voyager 2 Space craft send by NASA when it flew past Uranus in January 1986 
Paper Published: 
i.	Sky and Telescope, December 1981, p 541 
ii.	Modified Titius-Bode Empirical Relation 
Bulletin of Astronomical Society of India, 6, 92–95, 1978 
iii.	Contractions of Sub-Solar Nebula, Earth, 
Moon and Planets 44, 265–274, 1989 
iv.	Planetary Distance Law and Resonance 
J. Astrophys Astr. 10, 257-259(1989) 
v.	Further considerations of Contraction of Solar Nebula 
Earth, Moon and Planets 34, 93–100, 1986 
vi.	Formation of the Solar System 
Astrophysics and Space Science, 119, 159-166 (1986)

[6] 
Rings Around Neptune and its new Satellites. 
Observations: 
Voyager 2 space craft sent by NASA which flew past Neptune in September 1989 
Paper Published:
i.	News Notes Sky & Telescope December 1981 p. 541 
ii.	Resonant Structures in the Solar System 
The Moon and the Planets, 24, (1981), 407-414 
iii.	Contractions of Sub-Solar Nebula, 
Earth, Moon and Planets 44, 265–274, 1989 
iv.	Planetary Distance Law and Resonance 
J. Astrophys Astr. 10, 257-259(1989) 
v.	Further considerations of Contraction of Solar Nebula 
Earth, Moon and Planets 34, 93–100, 1986 
vi.	Modified Titius-Bode Empirical Relation 
Bulle of Astro. Soc. of India 6, 92 – 95, (1978) 
vii.	Formation of the Solar System 
Astrophysics and Space Science 119, 159–166, (1986)
 
[7] 
14th Satellite of Neptune 
Observations: 
Hubble Space Telescope Discovery by team of astronomers of such for Extraterrestrial Intelligence Institute at Mount View California headed by Dr. Mark Solasters in March, 2019 
Paper Published: 
i.	News Notes Sky & Telescope December 1981 p. 541 
ii.	Resonant Structures in the Solar System 
The Moon and the Planets, 24, (1981), 407-414 
iii.	Contractions of Sub-Solar Nebula, 
Earth, Moon and Planets 44, 265–274, 1989 
iv.	Planetary Distance Law and Resonance 
J. Astrophys Astr. 10, 257-259(1989) 
v.	Further considerations of Contraction of Solar Nebula 
Earth, Moon and Planets 34, 93–100, 1986 
vi.	Modified Titius-Bode Empirical Relation 
Bulle of Astro. Soc. of India 6, 92 – 95, (1978) 
vii.	Formation of the Solar System 
Astrophysics and Space Science 119, 159–166, (1986)

[8] 
Plunge of a comet into Jupiter, July 1994 
Observations by Galileo Space craft and Hubble Space Telescope 
Paper Published: 
A Hypothesis on the Oort Clouds of Planets 
Earth, Moon and Planets 54, 89-102 (1991)

[9] 
Disruption of Phobos - a satellite of Mars 
Paper Published by UC Berkeley team 
Benjamin Black and Tushar Mittal, 2015 
Paper Published by J.J. Rawal: 
i.	Resonant Structures in the Solar System 
The Moon and Planets 24, 407-414 (1981) 
ii.	Contractions of Sub-Solar Nebula 
Earth, Moon and Planets 44, 265–274, (1989)

[10] 
Four Satellites of Pluto 
Observation by Hubble Space Telescope 
Paper Published: 
Are there rings around Pluto? 
IJFPS, 1, pp 6–10, 2011

[11] 
Satellites of Jovian System 
Observed by Voyager 1 and 2 
Paper Published: 
i.	Modified Titius-Bode Empirical Relation 
Bull. Astr. Soc. India, 6,92-95, (1978) 
ii.	Contractions of Sub-Solar Nebula 
Earth, Moon and Planets 44, 265-274 (1989)

[12] 
Three New Asteroidal Belts between Mars and Jupiter in addition to one already in existence. 
Observed by Low et al. (1984) have reported the findings of IRAS of three more asteroidal belts at distances 2.2, 2.3 and 3.2 AU in addition to the already existing one in asteroidal belt at a mean distance 2.8 AU 
Paper Published: 
i.	Contraction of the Solar Nebula 
Earth, Moon and Planets 31, 175-182 (1984) 
ii.	Sky & Telescope, December 1981, p. 541 
iii.	Further Considerations of Contraction of Solar Nebula 
Earth, Moon and Planet, 34, 93-100 (1986) 
iv.	Planetary Distance Law and Resonance 
J. strophys. Astr. 10, 257-259 (1989)

[13] 
10th Planet Beyond Pluto 
Observed by Jewitt and Luu 1992 QBI moving beyond the orbit of Neptune on August 30, 1992, using a 2.2 meter telescope and sophisticated Charge Coupled Device (CCD) Camera on Mouna Kea Hawaii 
Paper Publushed: 
i.	Modified Titius-Bode Empirical Relation 
Bull. Astron. Soc India 6, 92-95 (1978) 
ii.	Contraction of Solar Nebula 
Earth, Moon and Planets 31, 175-182 (1984).

[14] 
11th Planet Beyond Pluto 
Observed by NASA Scientists in 2005. 
Paper Published: 
i.	Contraction of the Solar Nebula 
Earth, Moon and Planets 31, 175-182 (1984) 
ii.	Sky & Telescope, December 1981, p. 541 
iii.	Further Considerations of Contraction of Solar Nebula 
Earth, Moon and Planet, 34, 93-100 (1986) 
iv.	Planetary Distance Law and Resonance 
J. strophys. Astr. 10, 257-259 (1989)

[15] 
Tides in the Solar System showing volcanic Activities on Triton, IO 
Observed by Voyager 2 (1989) 
Paper was submitted to Bull. Astr. Soc. India in 1986 it was rejected but in 1898 it came true.

[16]
Rawal's theory of Contraction of Solar Nebula provided theoretical support for existence of Chiron small planet between Saturn and Uranus discovered by Charles T. Kowal in 1977.

20th-century Indian astronomers
Scientists from Gujarat
1943 births
Living people
University of Calcutta alumni
People from Surendranagar district